Andrei Iancu (born April 2, 1968) is an American-Romanian engineer and intellectual property attorney, who served as the under secretary of commerce for intellectual property and director of the United States Patent and Trademark Office (USPTO) from 2017 to 2021. He was nominated for both positions in 2017 by President Donald Trump. He left office January 20, 2021.

Early life and education
Iancu was born in Bucharest. He earned a Bachelor of Science degree in in aerospace engineering, a Master of Science in mechanical engineering, and a Juris Doctor from the University of California, Los Angeles. At UCLA, he was initiated into Sigma Pi fraternity.

Career
Before entering law school, Iancu was an engineer at Hughes Aircraft, from 1989 to 1993.

Following law school, in 1999, Iancu joined Irell & Manella, of which he became the managing partner in 2012.

His legal practice focused on intellectual property litigation. As an attorney, Iancu appeared before the United States Patent and Trademark Office, the United States International Trade Commission, U.S. district courts, and the United States Court of Appeals for the Federal Circuit.

In 2006, while Iancu was a partner at Irell & Manella, the firm represented Donald Trump, NBC Universal and Mark Burnett in a copyright suit which alleged that Mark Bethea and Velocity Entertainment Group had originally pitched The Apprentice to the production team, under the title of CEO. The case was "jointly settled out of court with an undisclosed settlement paid to Bethea" that year.

Iancu is also a lecturer of patent law at his alma mater, the UCLA School of Law.

USPTO
Iancu was nominated by President Trump on August 26, 2017; approved by the Senate Judiciary Committee on December 14, 2017; confirmed by the Senate 94–0 on February 5, 2018; and assumed the offices of Under Secretary and Director on February 8, 2018, when he was sworn in.

In 2020, Iancu was in office during the sharpest declines and inclines of trademark applications in history. During Spring, COVID-19 lockdowns led to fewer filings, which then increased in July 2020, exceeding the previous July. September 2020 was subsequently the highest month of trademark filings in the history of the U.S. Patent and Trademark Office.

References

External links 
 Presidential Nomination no. 927, 115th Congress, U.S. Senate Judiciary Committee. September 5, 2017.

|-

Living people
20th-century American lawyers
21st-century American lawyers
Romanian emigrants to the United States
California lawyers
American patent attorneys
Trump administration personnel
Under Secretaries of Commerce for Intellectual Property
UCLA Henry Samueli School of Engineering and Applied Science alumni
UCLA School of Law faculty
UCLA School of Law alumni
1968 births